"Forgive and Regret" is the eighteenth episode of the twenty-ninth season of the American animated television series The Simpsons, and the 636th episode of the series overall. It aired in the United States on Fox on April 29, 2018. The title is a play on "forgive and forget". The episode deals with the relationship between Homer and Grampa hitting rock bottom once again, the result of a secret that the latter held from his son.

As of this episode, The Simpsons surpassed Gunsmoke to become the longest-running scripted American primetime television series by number of episodes. This event was marked in the opening sequence by a gunfight between Maggie and Marshal Matt Dillon.

Plot
While trying to leave Moe's Tavern, Homer accidentally knocks over a streetlight. A man appears, asking Homer to sell his car for $500 to repair the damages to the streetlamp, which he accepts because his car will be used in a demolition derby. While at the derby, Grampa has a heart attack, and Homer is faced with the solution to either watch the rest of the derby and see his car win, or escort his father to the hospital, Homer agrees to help him. On his deathbed, Grampa makes a startling confession to Homer, who forgives him because he thinks his father is about to die and he wants to have peace between them before that happens.

However, Grampa ends up surviving, and he increasingly mocks and laughs at Homer while reminding him that Homer promised to keep his secret. The family, surprised by Homer's "silent treatment", decides to make them bond once again, only leading to an altercation between both of them at Moe's and an unsuccessful session at an entertainment center (formerly a mall). When Grandpa plays the victim, he then watches in horror as Homer coldly tells the family the deathbed secret. In Homer's youth, he and his mother Mona bonded over baking pies. After she left home, Grampa, in an attempt to forget about Mona, threw her recipe box off a cliff. The family turns against Grampa, and decides to condemn him for his actions at the Retirement Castle, only to find that Grampa, who now feels guilty of what he did many years ago, is going to the cliff to find the box. Homer plans to stop him because the recipe box is still resting on a cliffside, and Grampa could lose his life getting them. Homer helps him to safety and to get the recipe box, and for a minute Grampa looks like he is sacrificing himself so that Homer can reach it, but when Homer gets to it, Grampa lands on a bed he got rid of many years earlier. However, the box is empty.

While stopping at a nearby restaurant, Homer recognizes the taste of the pie he is eating as the same one he and his mother used to bake. The waitress tells him that she found the recipes falling down the cliff when Grampa tossed them out and gives them to Homer, wrapped in a bow, and Homer and Grampa make up and reconcile once again.

The tag features Homer buying his old car again, finding that Snowball II had been there the whole time.

Reception
Dennis Perkins of The A.V. Club gave this episode a B−, stating, "To the show’s credit, the episode itself makes only passing mention of the at-least numerically impressive feat, with the cold open seeing a once-again pistol-packing Maggie gunning down Gunsmoke’s Marshall Matt Dillon. Credited to Simpsons writing stalwart Bill Odenkirk, ‘Forgive and Regret’, instead, dedicates itself to telling a single story, once more revisiting the justifiably fraught (on both sides) father-son relationship between Abe and Homer Simpson."

"Forgive and Regret" scored a 1.0 rating with a 4 share and was watched by 2.47 million people, making it Fox's highest rated show of the night.

References

2018 American television episodes
The Simpsons (season 29) episodes